Dana Walden (born 1964) is an American businesswoman and the Co-Chairman of Disney Entertainment.

Career 
Dana Walden was named Co-Chairman of Disney Entertainment on February 8, 2023, overseeing Disney's full portfolio of entertainment media, news and content businesses globally, including Disney's streaming business. In this role, Walden leads Disney's world-renowned, award-winning content brands and businesses, including ABC Entertainment, ABC News, ABC Owned Television Stations, Disney Branded Television, Disney Television Studios (20th Television, ABC Signature, 20th Television Animation and Walt Disney Television Alternative), Freeform, FX, Hulu Originals, National Geographic Content and Onyx Collective. Walden previously served as chairman of Disney General Entertainment Content.
 
She is responsible for some of the biggest scripted and unscripted hits on television and streaming, and is recognized for being a loyal creative partner for some of the most prolific creators in the business. Throughout her career, she has established early relationships with some of today's most renowned showrunners including Lee Daniels, Ryan Murphy, Liz Meriwether and David E. Kelley, who all remain her collaborators at Walt Disney Television today. 
 
Under Walden’s leadership, ABC has secured its position as the No. 1 entertainment network for three consecutive seasons – the first time that has happened in 25 years. Since she began overseeing Hulu’s signature Original series in 2019, the streamer has seen record viewership for such hits as The Handmaid’s Tale, The Kardashians and Only Murders in the Building. Additionally, ABC News continues to dominate as the #1 news network in America, with such iconic programs as 20/20, Good Morning America, Nightline and World News Tonight.
 
Over the past three decades, Walden has overseen the development and production of some of the most celebrated shows in the history of the television industry, including 24, Glee, Grey’s Anatomy, Homeland, and This Is Us; culture-defining franchises like American Horror Story, black-ish, Family Guy and The Simpsons; unscripted stalwarts like American Idol, Dancing With The Stars and Jimmy Kimmel Live!; classic children’s programming like Bluey and Mickey Mouse Clubhouse; and the most current breakout hits, Abbott Elementary, The Bear, Dopesick, The Dropout and The Old Man. In 2022, programming under Walden’s oversight earned an impressive 288 Emmy® nominations across daytime, primetime, news and documentary and children’s and family categories; as well an Oscar for Summer of Soul (…Or, When the Revolution Could Not Be Televised). Throughout her career, teams under Walden’s supervision have been responsible for programs that have won more than 1,000 awards.
 
In 2021, Walden was given a Lifetime Achievement Award from Harvard Undergraduate Women in Business. She has received the National Association of Television Program Executive's Brandon Tartikoff Legacy Award and was named MIPCOM's Personality of the Year. In 2013, she was inducted into Broadcasting & Cable's Television Hall of Fame. She has been named Showman of the Year by Variety, Television Showman of the Year by the Publicists of the International Cinematographers Guild, and Executive of the Year in 2019 by The Hollywood Reporter.

Fox Television Group 
Walden previously served as chairman and CEO of Fox Television Group, which included Fox Broadcasting Company, 20th Century Fox Television, Fox 21 Television Studios, Fox Consumer Products and the syndication supplier, 20th Television. In the four years she oversaw Fox Broadcasting Company, she took the network from fourth place to first.
 
During her 25 years at 21st Century Fox, the studios overseen by Walden amassed 184 Emmy wins, 29 Golden Globes, 17 Screen Actors Guild Awards and 24 Peabody Awards and Humanitas Prizes. Additionally, Walden was responsible for hit after hit, from the No. 1 broadcast hits, like This Is Us and Empire, to multiple Emmy Award winners Modern Family, Homeland, Ally McBeal, Arrested Development and The Practice.  Other landmark series overseen by Walden include 24, Family Guy, Bob's Burgers, How I Met Your Mother, Glee, and Buffy the Vampire Slayer, and The Simpsons, which is the longest-running primetime scripted series of all time. She has also overseen the long and successful partnership between 20th Television and FX and FX Productions, resulting in The Americans, Sons of Anarchy, Pose, American Horror Story and the American Crime Story franchise.

The Walt Disney Company 
On June 9, 2022, Walden replaced Peter Rice as Chairman of Disney General Entertainment Content. Walden was previously chairman of Entertainment, Walt Disney Television.

Board Positions & Other roles 
In addition to her work in storytelling, Walden has been recognized throughout her career for championing women into leadership positions in entertainment and continuing to bring marginalized voices to the table. While at Disney, she installed a largely female leadership across her portfolio. She is also responsible for launching Onyx Collective, an entirely new content brand created to curate a slate of premium content from new and established creators of color.
 
Walden sits on the board of directors for Live Nation Entertainment, UCLA's Jonsson Comprehensive Cancer Center and the Saban Free Clinic of Los Angeles. Additionally, she is a member of USC’s President’s Leadership Council and the President’s Circle of the NAACP.

Personal life 
Walden is married and has two children. She lives in Brentwood, Los Angeles. Her grandmother Rose Freedman was a survivor of the Triangle Shirtwaist Factory fire who lived to 107.

Early life and education 
Dana Freedman was born to a Jewish family in Los Angeles in 1964. Her father was in the travel industry and her mother was a dancer. As a teenager, Walden rode show hunters competitively. She earned a degree in communications from the University of Southern California.

References 

American chief executives in the media industry
American women chief executives
University of Southern California alumni
American television executives
20th-century American Jews
1964 births
Living people
Businesspeople from Los Angeles
People from Brentwood, Los Angeles
Disney executives
21st-century American Jews
American Broadcasting Company executives
Presidents of the American Broadcasting Company